Just Josh is an American talk show hosted by television personality, writer, and director Josh Rosenzweig. Filmed on location throughout New York City, Rosenzweig conducts celebrity interviews, visits premiere VIP events, and discusses all things pop culture. The show premiered on LGBT-targeted network here! on January 28, 2011.

here! produced 19 episodes for season one, and has begun production on the show's second season.

In 2012 it was announced that episodes of Just Josh will be made available on online video service Hulu.

Premise
In each Just Josh episode, host Josh Rosenzweig visits a popular New York City destination. He has been seen taking fencing lessons, country line dancing, and takes an aerobics class with Cherie Lily.

The show then returns to the studio where Rosenzweig interviews guests of particular interest to here!'s LGB audience. Guests to date have included Molly Shannon, Isabella Rossellini, Duran Duran, Judith Light and Tabatha Coffey.

Episodes

Season One

Episode 1:

Josh interviews Johnny Rosza, Charles Busch, and goes behind the scenes at Alias restaurant in New York City.

Episode 2:

The second episode includes interviews with 80's pop duo, Duran Duran and musician Ari Gold.

Episode 3:

Josh interviews Tabatha Coffey from Bravo TV's Tabatha Takes Over, visits with Bob Pontarelli of Industry, and spotlights Tom Viola of Broadway Cares/Equity Fights AIDS.

Episode 4:

Josh visits the set of Promises, Promises and interviews Molly Shannon, talks to singing sensation Sylvia Tosun and takes in a performance at Bar D'O starring Joey Arias and Sherry Vine.

Episode 5:

Josh interviews Isabella Rossellini, Crayton Robey and gives two-stepping a shot at the Valentine's Day Pajama Event at Big Apple Ranch.

Episode 6:

Josh learns the art of graffiti from NYC's Dick Chicken, interviews Casey Spooner, and works out with Cherie Lily at Crunch Fitness.

Episode 7:

Josh talks to Charo, gives fencing a stab with U.S. Olympic silver medalist Tim Morehouse and learns the art of meatballs in the L.E.S.

Episode 8:

Josh travels to Palm Springs during the largest lesbian event in the world - The Dinah, where he talks to The Dinah organizer, Mariah Hanson.

Cast

Main cast
 Josh Rosenzweig is the show's host.

Guests
 Johnny Rosza
 Charles Busch
 Duran Duran
 Ari Gold
 Tabatha Coffey
 Molly Shannon
 Isabella Rossellini
 Casey Spooner
 Charo
 Tim Morehouse
 Mariah Hanson
 Candace Bushnell
 Judith Light
 Leslie Jordan
 Cazwell
 Terrence McNally
 Daniela Brooker

References

External links

American television talk shows
2011 American television series debuts
Here TV original programming